Haifa al-Agha is the Minister of Women's Affairs for the new Palestinian unity government created in 2014.

Al-Agha is educated from the Oklahoma State University, where she obtained her PhD in 1991 in Educational Studies. She has formerly served as the Minister of Education, for Hamas on the Gaza Strip.

References 

Living people
Women's ministers
21st-century women politicians
Oklahoma State University alumni
Government ministers of the State of Palestine
Women government ministers of the Palestinian National Authority
Year of birth missing (living people)